Goleninskaya is a rural locality (a village) in Troitskoye Rural Settlement, Ust-Kubinsky District, Vologda Oblast, Russia. The population was 2 as of 2002.

Geography 
Goleninskaya is located 48 km northwest of Ustye (the district's administrative centre) by road. Afanasovskaya is the nearest rural locality.

References 

Rural localities in Ust-Kubinsky District